UberStudent is a free and open-source computer operating system and collection of programs aimed especially toward higher education and secondary students and their teachers and schools. The lead developer of the Linux distribution placed the project on hold in May 2019 due to his son being amid a protracted battle with Acute lymphoblastic leukemia.

Dubbing itself "Linux for Learners", UberStudent describes itself as "a cohesive academic success curriculum integrated into an installable, easy-to-use, and full-featured learning platform" aimed at increasing overall student learning and academic computer literacy, and lifelong computer fluency. Its additional aim is to increase the adoption of free and open-source computing platforms, like itself, within higher education and secondary schools. It is designed around a "core academic skills approach to student success," which it describes as "the research and writing, reading, studying, and self-management skills that are essential to all students regardless of their academic major."

UberStudent's current release is 4.3, dubbed Heraclitus. The distribution uses its own dedicated software repository. It can be run from a live CD, USB flash drive, or installed onto a computer's hard drive from either of those mediums.

Support for the last published version, UberStudent 4.3, based on Ubuntu 14.04, ended in May 2019. As of May 26, 2019, the distribution's website went offline, while the domains are still owned by Uberstudent's lead developer, Stephen Ewen. Prior that date and afterward, per official statements made by Ewen on Uberstudent's official webpage, and added to in its lone public internet outlet afterward, Facebook. According to him, the project has been placed on hold, not discontinued or abandoned, because his son has been in a protracted battle with Acute lymphoblastic leukemia, which he detailed.

Origin and design
UberStudent's founder and lead developer is Stephen Ewen, a U.S.-based educator who specializes in postsecondary literacy, academic success strategies, and educational technology. He began UberStudent, he has said, as "a way to place a set of smart and dedicated computing tools, and just the right amount of support, into the hands of students, whether currently within higher education or preparing for it in secondary school." His stated goal through UberStudent is for students to "learn to really excel at the core skills and habits they need to become everything they can academically be, and on into professional life." Ewen has stated that UberStudent is, in part, inspired by his own experiences achieving top academic performance with the assistance of educational technology. 

Ewen has described UberStudent's overarching design philosophy as one that provides a "unified system for learning, doing, and teaching academic success". Within this, he has said that UberStudent takes what he calls a "core academic skills" approach, which he has delineated as "the skills in research and writing, studying, and self-management required of students across all academic majors". He has stated that UberStudent can be "easily extended" for specific majors via additional software. Ewen has additionally asserted that, in part due to UberStudent's open source and cross-platform nature, as well as its Unix-like base, it is geared to produce "computer fluency" among its users as a "more or less natural outcome".

Ewen has argued that academic institutions can increase both their student learning outcomes and economic efficiency by more broadly adopting open source application and system software for everyday student academic computing needs. He has additionally argued for academic institutions to increase their involvement in developing open source tools, such as UberStudent, citing successes such as the bibliographic manager Zotero by George Mason University, included among UberStudent's set of core academic programs.

Software and system

Nearly all of UberStudent's software is free and open-source and its core programs cross-platform so its adopters can avoid vendor lock-in, whether with Windows, Mac OS X, or Linux. The tech review site Dedoimedo reviewed UberStudent as containing a "superb" collection of "smartly selected" programs, "probably the best when it comes to serious work", with each "stitched into the fabric of the operating system". Tech columnist Jack Wallen said UberStudent "contains so many education-specific tools you will be spending your first days with it just marveling at what the developers have packed into one single operating system."

UberStudent's core programs for academic work are clustered within an applications menu entry, Education, where they are organized by sub-categories, including for Reading, Research and Writing, Self-Management, Study Aids, Subjects, and Utilities, which themselves have sub-categories. In addition to its academic-specific application set, reviewers have noted UberStudent's inclusion of templates for academic work and "tons" of on-board how-to guides as "welcome additions" that are "often missing" from other operating systems. UberStudent also contains a full range of student-oriented programs in the Multimedia, Games, Graphics, Internet, and several other categories. Within a separate menu, it contains select cloud computing applications that have been described as containing additions "you don't often see elsewhere".

Within its stated intent to couple user-friendliness with security and stability, UberStudent production releases are based on Xubuntu Long Term Stable releases, which stems from the Debian branch of Linux. UberStudent also includes numerous self-developed programs, as well as its own Update Manager and the deb file format to manage and update its platform.

Editions

UberStudent main editions are distributed as a DVD image or pre-made disc. The full edition features the Xfce desktop environment, and the lightweight edition the LXDE desktop environment. The LXDE lightweight edition is greatly scaled down and is intended solely "to re-invigorate low-specification or older computers" and fits on a single CD.

Criticisms of competing desktop environments
Amid his decision to feature Xfce in UberStudent full editions, Ewen stated that "UberStudent must prefer stability, dependability, and traditional usability over the novel when it comes to such a major thing as the basic desktop environments it uses; and it will."

GNOME 3, Ubuntu Unity
During UberStudent's 2.0 release cycle, Ewen criticized the designs of both the Ubuntu Unity and GNOME 3 Shell Linux desktop environments as hindrances to student academic computing productivity. In a 2011 April Fools' Day satire, he announced an "UberStudent Dumbed Down Edition" featuring the GNOME 3 Shell. Pointing to what he called "the enforced helplessness" leading to "learned helplessness" that he says the GNOME 3 developers designed into their new desktop environment, he stated that the intent behind the spoof UberStudent edition was to "obscure what is not obvious and easy so it can be continually avoided" by students and thus never learned. In a May 2011 interview, Ewen expanded his criticisms of Unity and GNOME 3 by citing specific usability issues, and stated that UberStudent had no plans to adopt either Unity or the GNOME 3 Shell.

Cinnamon
Amid UberStudent's 3.0 release cycle, Ewen criticized the Cinnamon desktop environment, developed by Linux Mint, pointing out what he called "major shortcomings" in Cinnamon, which he stipulated as its failure to honor certain fundamental freedesktop.org standards. Ewen stated that, while the desktop environment holds promise, "Cinnamon as of its full May 2013 version 1.8 release is actually beta-quality software." As such, he characterized Cinnamon as "not at all yet suited for a serious and stable workstation.

Releases and naming

According to Ewen, "UberStudent dubs each of its major releases after a famous historical thinker", a practice he describes as "only fitting" in light of UberStudent's educational mission. So far, the thinkers have been Greek and Roman. UberStudent's version 0.9, the first beta, was released on 15 January 2010 and named after Thales. Version 1.0, released on 15 July 2010, was named after Cicero. 1.0 also had a brief pre-release edition, once inadvertently reviewed as the release edition. UberStudent 1.0 Cicero Lightweight Edition was released on 4 September 2010 and inherited the name Cicero from the full edition. UberStudent 2.0 was dubbed "Plato," UberStudent 3.0 was dubbed "Aristotle," and the 4.0 release "Socrates". The current release, 4.3, is dubbed "Heraclitus."

5.0 is being delayed due to Ewen's son being diagnosed with Acute lymphoblastic leukemia.

Reception 
UberStudent has been described by reviewers as "highly in tune with student needs", "loaded with student-friendly tools and customizations", "perfect for the higher education environment", succeeding at its aims "with aplomb, elegance, and power", "a smart pick for getting your actual schoolwork done", and "fantastic and delicious".  It received a positive review in The Chronicle of Higher Education, which cited UberStudent's completeness for doing core academic work, user-friendliness, and free and open-source nature. Sixty days after UberStudent's official 15 July 2010 release of UberStudent 1.0 Cicero Full Edition, its first non-beta, DistroWatch ranked it the most popular Linux distribution for education worldwide and the 32nd most popular overall out of the 316 varied distributions tracked by the organization. Weeks after the 4.1 release, it ranked as the fifth-most popular Linux distribution in the world.

See also

 List of third-party Ubuntu-based Linux distributions
 Edubuntu
 Edtech

References

External links

UberStudent on SourceForge
UberStudent at DistroWatch

Ubuntu derivatives
Educational software
Free educational software
Educational operating systems
Linux distributions